The Wayne County Athletic League is an OHSAA athletic conference whose eight members are from Wayne County and Ashland County, Ohio.  The following are currently members:

Former members

League history

1920s
The league began slowly in the 1920s as a "B" league (smaller schools run by the county) with baseball and basketball serving as the primary sports of competition between the schools.  The first 16 teams to be members were Apple Creek, Big Prairie, Burbank, Chester, Congress, Creston, Dalton, Doylestown, Fredericksburg, Marshallville, Mount Eaton/Paint Township, Rittman, Shreve, Smithville, Sterling, and West Salem.
Apple Creek, Dalton, Doylestown and Rittman had the earliest (and at times, the only) football programs in the league.  They competed in the Wayne County "B" Football League beginning in 1924.
Apple Creek dropped football after the 1928 season.

1930s
In the later 30s, Rittman left the league after becoming an exempted village school while Big Prairie became part of the Holmes County school system.
In the spring of 1938, a Wayne County Coaches Association was formed to help organize the league's athletic play.
Marshallville lost their high school in 1938 when the state told them they could no longer function as a three-year high school.  They began sending their students to Dalton for the 1938-39 school year.

1940s
The former Marshallville High School was torn down in 1940 and replaced with an updated elementary school.

1950s
In 1951, Northwestern was created by merging Chester, Congress and West Salem with the northwestern areas of the county.  They began calling themselves the 'Huskies' and borrowed Chester's blue and Congress' gray as their new colors.
In 1953, Norwayne was created with the merger of Burbank, Creston, and Sterling.  The original proposed name for the district was 'Burlington' (BURbank, SterLING, and CresTON), but residents preferred the acronym for "Northern Wayne" County.  They chose the nickname 'Bobcats.'
In 1954, the first official football season began for the Wayne County Athletic League with Dalton, Doylestown, and Rittman playing right away.  Norwayne began playing the following year, while Shreve, Smithville, and Waynedale started up in 1956.
In 1955, Apple Creek, Fredericksburg, and Mt. Eaton/Paint Township consolidated to make Waynedale (the dale area of Wayne County).  They became the 'Golden Bears.'
Also in 1955, to prevent Marshallville students from being bused across the Orrville school district territory into Dalton, Marshallville's district was merged with Smithville's.  This move enabled the Smithies to start up a football team, but also caused a rivalry to start up with Dalton.
The league makeup was now at 8 schools: Dalton, Doylestown, Northwestern, Norwayne, Rittman, Shreve, Smithville, and Waynedale.

1960s
Rittman was invited back into the league in 1961 as a full-time member.
Triway was created in 1963 when Shreve (Clinton Township) combined with Franklin and Wooster townships.  They called themselves the 'Titans', after the new AFL team based in New York City.
Northwestern began league football play in 1965.

1970s
In 1970, Triway left the league for the Chippewa Conference and was replaced by Hillsdale, who had come over from the Firelands Conference.
Upon opening a much-needed new high school in 1971, Doylestown changed their name to Chippewa High School to reflect the trend that most of the district's residents were living in Chippewa Township and not within Doylestown itself.  They felt it redundant to call themselves the 'Chippewa Chippewas', so they shortened their nickname to the 'Chipps.'  Despite these changes, many locals still refer to the school as "Doylestown."

2010s
On December 3, 2011, the WCAL had its first-ever state football champion when Norwayne defeated Kenton 48-42 in the Division IV championship at Paul Brown Tiger Stadium in Massillon.

Boys league championships

Girls league championships

Ohio High School Athletic Association State Championships

Baseball
1933: West Salem
1959: Northwestern
1966: Northwestern
2022: Waynedale (D-III)
Boys Basketball
1957-58: Northwestern
1964-65: Northwestern
Football
2011: Norwayne (D-IV)
Softball
1979: Hillsdale
1994: Hillsdale
1996: Hillsdale
1999: Hillsdale
2000: Hillsdale
2006: Dalton (D-IV)
2007: Dalton (D-IV)
2010: Hillsdale (D-III)
Boys Track & Field
2022: Norwayne (D-III)
Girls Track & Field
1975: Chippewa
Wrestling
2011-12: Waynedale (D-III)

See also
 Ohio High School Athletic Conferences

References

Further reading
Vasas, Michale Paul, A History of Wayne County Football 1899 to 1988, Collier Printing Company of Wooster, Ohio. 1989.
History of Wayne County, Ohio, "Wayne County History Book Committee." Taylor Publishing Company, Dallas, Texas. 1987.

External links
 History of the Wayne County Athletic League
 Milwaukee Journal Story noting the Mount Eaton High School basketball team's 6-year losing streak.  18 Dec, 1953
 WCAL Football Playoff Appearances

Ohio high school sports conferences